Henri Jacob van Abbe (8 January 1880 – 18 November 1940) was a Dutch tobacco industrialist and art collector. He is the founder of the Van Abbemuseum in Eindhoven.

Life 
Henri Jacob van Abbe was born on 8 January 1880 in Amsterdam in the Netherlands.

He was a cigar manufacturer in Eindhoven, and in 1900 he started a cigar factory in Amsterdam which grew into a prosperous business. An avid art collector and lover of art, he founded the Van Abbemuseum in Eindhoven in 1936, to which he gave a major donation.

With Tinus van Bakel, a colleague in tobacco and art, he regularly traveled to Belgium in the 1930s to buy art. One of the places they visited (in 1936) was the artists' colony of Sint-Martens-Latem.

Van Abbe died on 18 November 1940 in Eindhoven.

References

External links

Henri van Abbe at Thuis in Brabant

1880 births
1940 deaths
Businesspeople from Amsterdam
Dutch art collectors
People from Eindhoven
20th-century Dutch businesspeople